Orlja may refer to:
 Orlja, Pljevlja, Montenegro
 Orlja (Pirot), Serbia